Lo Kwan Yee (born 9 October 1984) is a Hong Kong professional footballer who currently plays for Hong Kong Premier League club Rangers.

Lo has represented Hong Kong at international level at various age groups, making his debut with the senior national team in 2007.

Club career

Rangers
Lo broke into the Rangers first team at only 15 years old. He made his first-team debut as a substitute in Rangers' 1–0 win at home to Kitchee on 14 August 2000, scoring the match winner in the 88th minute. The midfielder became the youngest-ever player to play in the First Division at 15 years and 309 days.

Kitchee
On 2 July 2007, Lo signed for Kitchee after his 8-year spell with Rangers, signing a one-year deal, with an option of another one-year extension. He was given the number 12 shirt.

On 2 September 2007, Lo made his league debut for Kitchee against rivals South China, ending in a 2–1 victory. Lo suffered from hepatitis after the match and was kept out of first-team action for eight weeks. Lo then scored a goal in the Senior Shield Final 2007–08 against Eastern on 23 December 2007, which eventually ended in a 3–1 victory for Eastern.

In the 2010–11 season, Lo Kwan Yee played as right back for Kitchee. On 23 September 2010, in the 6:0 win over HKFC, Lo Kwan Yee was kicked in the head from goalkeeper Rudolf Karel Hollaender after scoring the second goal and had to be substituted. He received two stitches on his left ear. At the end of the season, he helped the club win the league title by 1 point over South China. This was the club's first league title in 47 years, allowing the club to compete in the 2011 Barclays Asia Trophy and 2012 AFC Cup.

Ken Ng of Kitchee announced on 2 August 2011 that he has taken disciplinary action against Lo Kwan Yee for playing in a local soccer game without the club's consent, by stripping him of the club's captaincy. Further actions may follow.

On 26 May 2018, Lo made his final appearance for Kitchee as the club won the 2017–18 Hong Kong FA Cup.

R&F
On 4 June 2018, it was reported that after a ten-year spell with Kitchee, Lo had signed with fellow Hong Kong Premier League side R&F. On 9 July, Lo confirmed to the media that he had signed a two-year contract with R&F. He was sent off in his first appearance for the club against Eastern at Hong Kong Stadium.

On 28 June 2020, Lo confirmed to the media that he had signed a new one-year contract to remain at R&F.

Rangers
Following R&F's decision to withdraw from the HKPL in the new season, Lo decided to return to Rangers after 13 years away.
 He was a regular starting XI and in his 20th game for rangers this season he scored his third goal with a 40 yards volley in the first match of relegation group on 17 May 2021.

Personal life
Lo was graduated from Ju Ching Chu Secondary School in Kwai Chung. His favourite player is Japanese midfielder Shinji Ono and he supports Liverpool F.C. He has a nickname Hong Kong Messi because of his various and magical technique also his height, body size and playing style. Lo Kwan Yee has a C grade football coaching license. He volunteered to coach his former school's pupils.

Lo Kwan Yee has a motorcycle license and he owns a Suzuki Skywave 400 s-Type. But since 2010 he has stopped riding motorcycles.

On 20 May 2012, Lo Kwan Yee won his girlfriend Canmy's hand in marriage with 99 roses and a ring after Kitchee beat Rangers 4–1 and successfully defended its league title.

Career statistics

International

Honours

Club
Kitchee
Hong Kong Premier League: 2014–15, 2016–17, 2017–18
Hong Kong First Division: 2010–11, 2011–12, 2013–14
Hong Kong Senior Shield: 2016–17
Hong Kong FA Cup: 2011–12, 2012–13, 2014–15, 2016–17, 2017–18
Hong Kong Sapling Cup: 2017–18
Hong Kong League Cup: 2011–12, 2014–15, 2015–16

Individual
Hong Kong Footballer of the Year: 2011–12
Team of the Season: 2010–11, 2011–12

References

External links

Lo Kwan Yee at HKFA

1984 births
Living people
Hong Kong footballers
Association football midfielders
Hong Kong Rangers FC players
Kitchee SC players
R&F (Hong Kong) players
Hong Kong First Division League players
Hong Kong Premier League players
Hong Kong international footballers
Footballers at the 2002 Asian Games
Footballers at the 2006 Asian Games
Footballers at the 2010 Asian Games
Asian Games competitors for Hong Kong
Hong Kong League XI representative players